Wantok Niuspepa (Wantok Newspaper) is a weekly newspaper in Papua New Guinea. It is the only Tok Pisin-language newspaper in Papua New Guinea, and is distributed throughout the country. It was first published on 5 August 1970 from an office in Wewak with Father Francis Mihalic, a member of the Society of the Divine Word order, as its editor; while the project had first been initiated by Catholic bishops, it subsequently received limited support thereafter. It moved to Port Moresby in 1976. It is now operated by the Word Publishing Company.

See also 
 List of newspapers in Papua New Guinea

External links
 Official site
Wantok Niuspepa UC San Diego Digital Archive 1972-2016

References

Newspapers published in Papua New Guinea